Partial general elections were held in Belgium on 24 May 1908. The result was a victory for the Catholic Party, which won 37 of the 82 seats in the Chamber of Representatives. The François Schollaert government remained in office.

Under the alternating system, elections were only held in four out of the nine provinces: Hainaut, Limburg, Liège and East Flanders.

Results

Chamber

Senate

References

Belgium
1900s elections in Belgium
General
Belgium